Tight junctions, also known as occluding junctions or zonulae occludentes (singular, zonula occludens), are multiprotein junctional complexes whose canonical function is to prevent leakage of solutes and water and seals between the epithelial cells. They also play a critical role maintaining the structure and permeability of endothelial cells. Tight junctions may also serve as leaky pathways by forming selective channels for small cations, anions, or water. The corresponding junctions that occur in invertebrates are septate junctions.

Structure 

Tight junctions are composed of a branching network of sealing strands, each strand acting independently from the others. Therefore, the efficiency of the junction in preventing ion passage increases exponentially with the number of strands.
Each strand is formed from a row of transmembrane proteins embedded in both plasma membranes, with extracellular domains joining one another directly. There are at least 40 different proteins composing the tight junctions. These proteins consist of both transmembrane and cytoplasmic proteins. The three major transmembrane proteins are occludin, claudins, and junction adhesion molecule (JAM) proteins. These associate with different peripheral membrane proteins such as ZO-1 located on the intracellular side of plasma membrane, which anchor the strands to the actin component of the cytoskeleton.  Thus, tight junctions join together the cytoskeletons of adjacent cells.

Transmembrane proteins:

 Occludin was the first integral membrane protein to be identified. It has a molecular weight of ~60kDa. It consists of four transmembrane domains and both the N-terminus and the C-terminus of the protein are intracellular. It forms two extracellular loops and one intracellular loop. These loops help regulate paracellular permeability. Occludin also plays a key role in cellular structure and barrier function. 
 Claudins were discovered after occludin and are a family of over 27 different members in mammals. They have a molecular weight of ~20kDa. They have a structure similar to that of occludin in that they have four transmembrane domains and similar loop structure. They are understood to be the backbone of tight junctions and play a significant role in the tight junction's ability to seal the paracellular space. 
 Junctional Adhesion Molecules (JAM) are part of the immunoglobulin superfamily. They have a molecular weight of ~40 to 48 kDa. Their structure differs from that of the other integral membrane proteins in that they only have one transmembrane domain instead of four. It helps to regulate the paracellular pathway function of tight junctions and is also involved in helping to maintain cell polarity.
 Angulins were discovered in 2011 by visual screening of proteins which localize at tricellular tight junctions. There are three members of angulins, Angulin-1/LSR, Angulin-2/ILDR1, and Angulin-3/ILDR2. Similar to JAMs, angulins are single-transmembrane proteins. All angulins have one immunoglobulin-like domain in the extracellular region and one PDZ-binding motif at the carboxy-terminus. They are responsible for establishment of tricellular tight junctions and regulate the paracellular barrier function.

Functions
They perform vital functions: 
 Tight junctions provide endothelial and epithelial cells with barrier function, which can be further subdivided into protective barriers and functional barriers serving purposes such as material transport and maintenance of osmotic balance:
 Tight junctions prevent the passage of molecules and ions through the space between plasma membranes of adjacent cells, so materials must actually enter the cells (by diffusion or active transport) in order to pass through the tissue. Investigation using freeze-fracture methods in electron microscopy is ideal for revealing the lateral extent of tight junctions in cell membranes and has been useful in showing how tight junctions are formed. The constrained intracellular pathway exacted by the tight junction barrier system allows precise control over which substances can pass through a particular tissue. (Tight junctions play this role in maintaining the blood–brain barrier.) At the present time, it is still unclear whether the control is active or passive and how these pathways are formed. In one study for paracellular transport across the tight junction in kidney proximal tubule, a dual pathway model is proposed: large slit breaks formed by infrequent discontinuities in the TJ complex and numerous small circular pores.
Tight junctions help to maintain the apicobasal polarity of cells by preventing the lateral diffusion of integral membrane proteins between the apical and lateral/basal surfaces, allowing the specialized functions of each surface (for example receptor-mediated endocytosis at the apical surface and exocytosis at the basolateral surface) to be preserved. This allows polarized transcellular transport and specialised functions of apical and basolateral membranes.

Classification 
Epithelia are classed as "tight" or "leaky", depending on the ability of the tight junctions to prevent water and solute movement: 
 Tight epithelia have tight junctions that prevent most movement between cells. Examples of tight epithelia include the distal convoluted tubule, the collecting duct of the nephron in the kidney, and the bile ducts ramifying through liver tissue. Other examples are the blood-brain barrier and the blood cerebrospinal fluid barrier
 Leaky epithelia do not have these tight junctions, or have less complex tight junctions. For instance, the tight junction in the kidney proximal tubule, a very leaky epithelium, has only two to three junctional strands, and these strands exhibit infrequent large slit breaks.

See also 
 Cadherin
 Gap junction
 Tight junction protein (disambiguation)
 Zonulin
 Adherens junction

References

External links 

 An Overview of the Tight Junction at Zonapse.Net
 Occludin in Focus at Zonapse.Net
 
 

Cell anatomy